Olaipadi is a village in the Papanasam taluk of Thanjavur district, Tamil Nadu, India. The village is situated on the northern side four km from Swamimalai near Kumbakonam and one km northeast from Adhanur, one of the 108 Divyadesams, has a temple for Lord Vishnu.

Demographics 

As per the 2001 census, Olaipadi had a total population of 1670 with 832 males and 838 females. The sex ratio was 1007. The literacy rate was 70.01.

References 

Villages in Thanjavur district